Luigi Pampaloni (Florence, 1791–1847) was an Italian sculptor, active in a Neoclassical style.

He studied under Lorenzo Bartolini in Florence. In 1826, he completed with the collaboration of Ottavio Giovannozzi the design of the Fountain of the Naiads in Empoli. In 1834, he completed a bust of Maria Antonietta of Bourbon, sister of Ferdinand II of Naples, and second wife of Leopold II the Granduke of Tuscany. He sculpted a statue of her husband, Leopold II, for a piazza in San Miniato. He also sculpted statues of Brunelleschi and Arnolfo di Cambio for the Duomo of Florence, and the full-length Leonardo da Vinci statue for the Loggiato of the Uffizi.

Gallery

References

1791 births
1847 deaths
19th-century Italian sculptors
Italian male sculptors
19th-century Italian male artists